Loivre is a commune in the Marne department in north-eastern France. Loivre station has rail connections to Reims and Laon.

Administration

Communal governance 
The commune is governed by the Mayor and a Municipal Council composed of fourteen members.

Intercommunal governance 
Since 1 January 2017, the commune has been part of the Communauté urbaine du Grand Reims, which provides integrated communal services to both Reims and the surrounding area. Prior to 2017, the commune was part of the Communauté de communes de la Colline from 23 December 1994 until 1 January 2014, and the Communauté de communes du Nord Champenois between 2014 and 2017.

References

See also
Communes of the Marne department

Communes of Marne (department)